The 2021–22 Coupe de France preliminary rounds, overseas departments and territories made up the qualifying competition to decide which teams from the French Overseas Departments and Territories took part in the main competition from the seventh round.

A total of eleven clubs qualified from the overseas leagues, two each from Guadeloupe, French Guiana, Martinique, Réunion, and one each from Mayotte, New Caledonia and Tahiti. In 2020–21 Club Franciscain from Martinique survived longest in the competition, beating a number of overseas clubs in playoff rounds to reach the round of 32, equalling the record for an overseas team's progression in the competition. They eventually lost to Ligue 1 club Angers.

Mayotte
A total of 80 teams from the four division of the Mayotte league entered the competition. The preliminary round draw was published on 11 June 2021, with 16 ties between clubs from Régional 4, the lowest division, and one team exempt to the first round.

A second preliminary round draw was due to be published in early July, but on 6 July 2021 the league announced that all teams would be qualified directly for the first round. The first round draw, including the remaining clubs, was published on 22 July 2021.

The round of 32 was drawn on 20 August 2021, originally to be played on 4 September 2021. The round of 16 and quarter final draws were published on 15 September 2021. The semi-final draw was published on 1 October 2021.

Preliminary round (Mayotte)
These matches were played on 27 June 2021.

Note: Mayotte League structure (no promotion to French League structure):Régionale 1 (R1)Régionale 2 (R2)Régionale 3 (R3)Régionale 4 (R4)

First round (Mayotte)
These matches were played on 7 and 8 August 2021, with one postponed until 18 September 2021.

Note: Mayotte League structure (no promotion to French League structure):Régionale 1 (R1)Régionale 2 (R2)Régionale 3 (R3)Régionale 4 (R4)

Round of 32 (Mayotte)
These matches were played on 11 and 12 September 2021, with one postponed until 22 September 2021.

Note: Mayotte League structure (no promotion to French League structure):Régionale 1 (R1)Régionale 2 (R2)Régionale 3 (R3)Régionale 4 (R4)

Round of 16 (Mayotte)
These matches were played on 25 September 2021, with one postponed until 2 October 2021.

Note: Mayotte League structure (no promotion to French League structure):Régionale 1 (R1)Régionale 2 (R2)Régionale 3 (R3)Régionale 4 (R4)

Quarter final (Mayotte)
These matches were played on 2 October 2021, with one postponed until 9 October 2021.

Note: Mayotte League structure (no promotion to French League structure):Régionale 1 (R1)Régionale 2 (R2)Régionale 3 (R3)Régionale 4 (R4)

Semi final (Mayotte)
These matches were played on 19 October 2021.

Note: Mayotte League structure (no promotion to French League structure):Régionale 1 (R1)Régionale 2 (R2)Régionale 3 (R3)Régionale 4 (R4)

Final (Mayotte)
This match was played on 30 October 2021.

Note: Mayotte League structure (no promotion to French League structure):Régionale 1 (R1)Régionale 2 (R2)Régionale 3 (R3)Régionale 4 (R4)

Réunion
As was the case last season, just sixteen teams were entered into the draw, all from Régionale 1, the top division of the Réunion football league. The calendar, comprising three qualifying rounds (named fourth, fifth and sixth) was published in May 2021.

The fourth round draw was made on 13 July 2021.

Fourth round (Réunion)
These matches were played on 18 and 28 July 2021, and 7 September 2021.
 

Note: Reúnion League structure (no promotion to French League structure):Régionale 1 (R1)Régionale 2 (R2)

Fifth round (Réunion)
These matches were played on 29 September 2021.

Note: Reúnion League structure (no promotion to French League structure):Régionale 1 (R1)Régionale 2 (R2)

Sixth round (Réunion)
These matches were played on 23 and 24 October 2021.

Note: Reúnion League structure (no promotion to French League structure):Régionale 1 (R1)Régionale 2 (R2)

French Guiana
A total of 33 teams from the two divisions of the French Guiana league entered the competition. This required a single-fixture round to take place before the first full round. The round naming convention used by the league aligns with those used for the mainland competition, so this competition starts with the second round. The draw for both second and third rounds was published on 9 October 2021.

Second round (French Guiana)
This match was played on 16 October 2021.

Note: French Guiana League structure (no promotion to French League structure):Régional 1 (R1)Régional 2 (R2)

Third round (French Guiana)
These matches were played on 16 and 23 October 2021.

Note: French Guiana League structure (no promotion to French League structure):Régional 1 (R1)Régional 2 (R2)

Fourth round (French Guiana)
These matches were played on 23 and 30 October 2021.

Note: French Guiana League structure (no promotion to French League structure):Régional 1 (R1)Régional 2 (R2)

Fifth round (French Guiana)
These matches were played on 3 November 2021.

Note: French Guiana League structure (no promotion to French League structure):Régional 1 (R1)Régional 2 (R2)

Sixth round (French Guiana)

These matches were played on 6 November 2021.

Note: French Guiana League structure (no promotion to French League structure):Régional 1 (R1)Régional 2 (R2)

Martinique
Due to the continuing COVID-19 pandemic in Martinique, football in the territory was still suspended in mid-October. In order to participate in the main competition, the Martinique Football League were informed by the FFF on 11 October 2021 that they must conclude the qualifying competition by 15 November 2021. On 19 October, the league published plans for an eight-team competition, starting on 3 November.

Fifth round (Martinique)
The opening round, titled Quarter final by the league, is analogous to the fifth round of the main competition. 
These matches were played on 30 and 31 October 2021.

Note: Martinique League structure (no promotion to French League structure):All teams are from Régionale 1 (R1)

Sixth round (Martinique)
These matches were played on 6 and 7 November 2021.

Guadeloupe
Due to the continuing COVID-19 pandemic in Guadeloupe, football in the territory was still suspended in mid-October. In order to allow two teams to join the main competition in November, the Guadeloupe Football League announced on 18 October 2021, via their Facebook page, an eight-team qualifying competition starting on 30 October 2021.

Fifth round (Guadeloupe)
The opening round is analogous to the fifth round of the main competition. 
These matches were played on 30 and 31 October 2021.

Sixth round (Guadeloupe)
These matches were played on 6 and 7 November 2021.

Saint Pierre and Miquelon
The Overseas Collectivity of Saint Pierre and Miquelon had only three teams, so there was just one match in each of two rounds, with one team receiving a bye to the second round. The first round took place on 7 July 2021, and the second round took place on 24 July 2021. The winner gained entry to the third round draw of the Pays de la Loire region.

First round (Saint Pierre and Miquelon)
The match was played on 7 July 2021.

Second round (Saint Pierre and Miquelon)
The match was played on 24 July 2021.

References

preliminary rounds